Bethel is a rural unincorporated community located west of U.S. Route 259 in McCurtain County, Oklahoma, United States. The post office opened January 24, 1900. The ZIP code is 74724.
This building is not a very active senior citizen's center but they have been known to meet to make quilts and eat. The building is used as a polling place for residents of Bethel and the surrounding area. There are two front doors to the building that open to separate rooms. In the 1980s and prior, people voted on the east side and the votes were manually counted by people on the west side. Currently, the east side is the senior citizen's side as well as the polling place and the west side houses a workout center. The building is about a half of a mile west from the Bethel Post Office.

Bethel Missionary Baptist Church is a little less than a half of a mile from the Bethel Post Office. The original building for the church was recently torn down and this picture is the new building. Within the last twenty years, the church has seen a new fellowship hall, a paved parking lot and growth in the church family.

Further reading
Shirk, George H. Oklahoma Place Names. Norman: University of Oklahoma Press, 1987. .

Unincorporated communities in McCurtain County, Oklahoma
Unincorporated communities in Oklahoma